Hady Amr (born April 8, 1964) is an American government official serving as special representative for Palestinian affairs since 22 November 2022. He was previously Deputy Assistant Secretary for Israeli and Palestinian Affairs in the Bureau of Near Eastern Affairs within the U.S. Department of State. The new position is a significant upgrade in relations with Palestine. He was appointed to the role under President Joe Biden on January 20, 2021. He was born in Lebanon, and has close ties to the region, being praised by both Israeli and Palestinian leaders alike.

He is a policy analyst and author in the area of U.S. relations with the Muslim world and on the Arab-Israeli conflict, Lebanon, Jordan, and the economic and social development of the Arab world.  He has served as a Senior Advisor in the Office of Policy at the Department of Homeland Security, as a Deputy Assistant Administrator for the Middle East at the United States Agency for International Development (USAID), and as United States Deputy Special Envoy for Israeli-Palestinian Negotiations from 2014–2017.

Biography 
Amr was born in Beirut, Lebanon in 1964, but grew up mostly in New Jersey and Virginia. He earned a B.A. in economics from Tufts University, before receiving an M.A. in International Affairs at Princeton University. He served in the administration of Bill Clinton in the Department of Defense. He served as an appointee, at which time he served briefly at the Near East South Asia Center for Strategic Studies at National Defense University. From 2001 to 2006, he managed an independent consulting practice, the Amr Group. He also worked for and advised the World Bank, the World Economic Forum, and other international institutions. He is a former economist and a consultant to the World Bank and the United Nations. He has written extensively about the impact of Palestinian uprisings and the prospects of peace in the region.

He is a member of the Council on Foreign Relations and previously served on Princeton University's Woodrow Wilson School of Public and International Affairs Advisory Committee. In 2002, Virginia Governor Mark Warner appointed him to serve on the Virginia Public Schools Authority, a position to which he was reappointed by Governor Tim Kaine, serving through 2010.

From 2006 to 2010, he served as a fellow at the Brookings Institution and the founding director of the Brookings Doha Center in Qatar. In 2010, he also served as a Senior Advisor in the Office of Policy at the Department of Homeland Security. From 2010–2013, he served as a Deputy Assistant Administrator for the Middle East at the United States Agency for International Development (USAID). He served as United States Deputy Special Envoy for Israeli-Palestinian Negotiations from 2014–2017, working on a team under Secretary of State John Kerry, focusing on  economic issues. He joined the negotiations team in the summer of 2013.

In November 2020, Amr was named a volunteer member of the Joe Biden presidential transition Agency Review Team to support transition efforts related to the United States Department of State.

Amr is the author of publications including The Need to Communicate: How to Improve U.S. Public Diplomacy with the Islamic World and "The Opportunity of the Obama Era: How Civil Society Can Help Bridge Divides between the United States and a Diverse Muslim World" published by Brookings. He has also been published by Newsweek, The Washington Post, the International Herald Tribune, and The Daily Star. For the U.N., he authored a number of reports, including "The State of the Arab Child".

In May 2021, he was sent to the Middle East to help in trying to defuse tensions between Israel and Palestine.

Following his promotion in late 2022, he gave a press interview in which he reiterated US support for the two state solution and the reopening of the consulate general for the Palestinians in Jerusalem.

References

External links
 Amr Group - bio
 USIP Advisory Committee on U.S.-Muslim World Relations  - bio
 Princeton Colloquium on Public and International Affairs - bio
 Names: Brookings' Amr to USAID - bio
 Can Civil Society Help Bridge Divides between the United States and a Diverse Muslim World? - Brookings Institution - bio
 Why Capitol Hill Supports Israel 

1964 births
Living people
Tufts University School of Arts and Sciences alumni
Princeton School of Public and International Affairs alumni
21st-century American diplomats
People from Beirut
Lebanese emigrants to the United States
Biden administration personnel
Brookings Institution people